Elachista amamii is a moth of the family Elachistidae. It is found in the Ryukyu Islands of Japan and in Taiwan.

The length of the forewings is 2.4–3 mm for males and 2.5–3 mm for females. Adults are sexually dimorphic. Male have dark grey-brownish forewing with two indistinct whitish costal spots while females have blackish forewings with four distinct silvery spots. There are multiple generations per year in Taiwan.

The larvae feed on Thuerea involuta, Digitaria timorensis and Digitaria adscendens. They mine the leaves of their host plant. The mine starts as a linear gallery, later becoming an elongate blotch.

References

Moths described in 1983
amamii
Moths of Japan
Moths of Taiwan